George Assang (1927–1997) was an Australian jazz and blues singer and actor from Thursday Island, Queensland, Australia. He performed under his own name and the stage name Vic Sabrino. Assang was of Aboriginal, Pacific Islander, and Asian descent.

Music career
As Vic Sabrino, he may have made the first Australian Rock'n'Roll recording. A single he recorded with French jazz artist Red Perksey and his orchestra included a version of "Rock Around the Clock". This single may have been recorded in 1955, some three years before Johnny O'Keefe's recording of "Wild One" in 1958.

Acting career
As an actor, Assang was featured in televisions and films. Assang had a major part in the TV series Barrier Reef (1971–1972), appeared in episodes of Skippy and Hunter (1968), Spyforce (1971), Boney (1972 and Number 96 (1974). He also acted in several films, the 1969 film The Intruders, the 1973 film And Millions Will Die, and was one of the voices in the animated movie Dot and the Kangaroo (1977). Under the Vic Sabrino name he had a short-lived television series in 1958 called Vic Sabrino Sings.

Personal life
Assang was briefly married to actress Rowena Wallace from 1973 until their divorce in 1974.

Discography

George Assang
with Trevor Jones' Orchestra
 "Daughter of Mona Lisa" (1955) Mercury

George and Ken Assang
 Just A Closer Walk (1965) Philips
 "Songs From Down Under" - The Colonials (1967) Phillips PD 200

Vic Sabrino
 "Dust in the Sun / Who Needs You" Festival

with Red Perksey & His Orchestra and Sheila Sewell
 "The End of the Affair/Drifting Along" Pacific AUS #19

with Red Perksey & His Orchestra
 "The Magic of Love/(We're gonna) Rock Around the Clock" (1955) Pacific
 "Merry-go-round/Time For Parting" (1955) Pacific
 "Blue Suede Shoes/Heartbreak Hotel" (1956) Pacific

with Dave Owens and his Blue Boys with The Blue Notes
 "Long, Long Lane/Painted Doll" (1957) Festival

with Gus Merzi's Orchestra and with Harry Willis Orchestra; and The Belltones & Iris Mason Singers
 "Fraulein/Hitch-Hiking Heart" (1957) Festival

with Graeme Bell and his Skiffle band
 "Sweet Georgia Brown/ Freight Train" (1957) Columbia
 "John Henry/Don't You Rock Me, Daddy-O" (1957) Columbia
 "The Gospel Train/Come Skiffle Chicken" (1957) Columbia
 "Gamblin' Man/Skiffle Board Blues" (1957) Columbia

References

THE FIRST WAVE: Australian rock & pop recordings, 1955–1963 by Ross Laird (pdf)
Australian Popular Music Recordings 1955–1969 by Ross Laird (pdf)

External links
Pop Archives feature
National Library of Australia Biographical cuttings on Vic Sabrino, actor and singer

1927 births
1997 deaths
20th-century Australian male singers
Indigenous Australian actors
Indigenous Australian musicians